Toxonagria is a genus of true flies in the family Sarcophagidae.

Species
T. arnaudi Pape, 1992
T. montanensis (Parker, 1919)

References 

Sarcophagidae
Schizophora genera